Chan Siu Wing, born April 26, 1993, is a Hong Kong professional basketball player.  He currently plays for the Eastern of the FIBA Asia Champions Cup, ASEAN Basketball League and the Hong Kong A1 Division Championship.

He represented Hong Kong basketball team at the 2015 FIBA Asia Championship in Changsha, China where he played most minutes for his team.

References

External links
 Asia-basket.com Profile

1992 births
Living people
Basketball players at the 2014 Asian Games
Hong Kong men's basketball players
Eastern Sports Club basketball players
Point guards
Shooting guards
ASEAN Basketball League players
Asian Games competitors for Hong Kong